Andrew Byron is an American politician and a Republican member of the Wyoming House of Representatives representing the 22nd district since January 10, 2023.

Political career
When incumbent independent representative Jim Roscoe announced his retirement, Byron declared his candidacy and won the Republican primary on August 16, 2022 unopposed. He then won the general election on November 8, 2022, defeating independent candidate Bob Strobel with 57% of the vote.

References

External links
Profile from Ballotpedia

Living people
Republican Party members of the Wyoming House of Representatives
People from Jackson, Wyoming
University of Wyoming alumni
21st-century American politicians
Year of birth missing (living people)